The Hakodate Kinen (Japanese 函館記念) is a Grade 3 horse race for Thoroughbreds aged three and over, run in July over a distance of 2000 metres on turf at Hakodate Racecourse.

It was first run in 1965 and has held Grade 3 status since 1984. The race was run over 2400 metres until 1967.

Winners since 2000

See also
 Horse racing in Japan
 List of Japanese flat horse races

References

Turf races in Japan